Hyla is a given name and surname.  Notable people with the name Hyla include:

Hyla Bristow Stallard (1901–1973, known as H. B. Stallard), English runner and ophthalmologist 
Hyla Willis, American artist
Adolf Hyła (1897–1965), Polish artist
Hyla Collier, Great person

See also
Hyla, a genus of tree frogs
Hylas (disambiguation)